Greeves is a surname. Notable people with the name include:

Augustus Greeves (1806–1874), Australian politician
Bert Greeves (1906–1993), British engineer
Carji Greeves (1903–1963), Australian rules footballer
Ernie Greeves (1873–1946), Australian rules footballer
Marion Greeves (1894–1979), Northern Irish politician
Stuart Greeves (1897–1989), British Indian Army officer
Ted Greeves (1878–1935), Australian rules footballer 
Teri Greeves (born 1970), Kiowa and American beadwork artist

See also
Greaves (surname)
Greves, surname
Grieves (surname)